Portable Character Set is a set of 103 characters which, according to the POSIX standard, must be present in any character set. Compared to ASCII, the Portable Character Set lacks some control characters, and does not prescribe any particular value encoding.
The Portable Character Set is a superset of the Basic Execution Character Set as defined by ANSI C.

References

Character sets
POSIX